Fefor is a wilderness area in Nord-Fron in Innlandet county, Norway. 

Nord-Fron
Geography of Innlandet